Shaila Abdullah (born 1971) is a Pakistani-American author, writer, and designer.

Life

Shaila Abdullah has received the Patras Bukhari Award for English Language, the Golden Quill Award, the Reader Views Award, the Written Art Award, and a grant from Hobson Foundation. Beyond the Cayenne Wall received the Jury Prize for Outstanding Fiction which is the highest award in the Norumbega Fiction Awards.

Her books include Saffron Dreams, Beyond the Cayenne Wall and three children's books: Rani in Search of a Rainbow, My Friend Suhana, and A Manual for Marco. She has also written books for children with special needs.

In early 2014, a research team from Washington and Lee University conducted a study in which they found that reading a 3,000-word extract from Saffron Dreams can make a person less racist. The novel was cited as 1 of 50 Greatest Works of Immigration Literature by Open Education Database.

Works
Beyond the cayenne wall : collection of short stories, Lincoln, NE : iUniverse, 2005. , 
Saffron dreams : a novel, Ann Arbor, MI : Modern History Press, 2010. , 
My friend Suhana, Ann Arbor, MI : Loving Healing Press, 2014. , 
A manual for Marco, Ann Arbor, MI : Loving Healing Press 2015. ,

References

External links
  
 If These Walls Could Talk, Nirali Magazine, April 2007

1971 births
21st-century American women writers
American women short story writers
Pakistani emigrants to the United States
Living people